The Rugby Club Unterföhring is a German rugby union club from Munich district, currently playing in the 2nd Rugby-Bundesliga and with a second team in the Verbandsliga Bayern. It is based in Unterföhring, the closest suburb to Munich city centre. Since January 2017 the RCU is the second biggest rugby club in Bavaria with 240 members.

Also Unterföhring was the smallest municipality in Germany with its own rugby union club from 2012 until 2016.
After the promotion to the 2. Bundesliga in 2016/17 Unterföhring is the only village (German: Gemeinde) in the history of German rugby to have ever played in a Bundesliga. All other clubs where always based in towns or cities (German: Stadt) or army bases.

The RCU also has a growing youth section and the club is the fourth biggest club with kids under 14 years old in all of Germany. The RCU has secured championships in the Under 8, Under 10 and Under 12 age groups in recent years, as well as runners-up in U8, U10, U12 and U14. The RCU youth teams are known for consistently being able to field complete sides in the Bavarian youth competition. The Rugby Club Unterföhring is the fourth biggest club in the district of Unterföhring.

Founded in 2016 the RCU also has a women's team playing in the Deutsche 7er-Liga Frauen Süd. For the season 2022/23 the aim of the first Men's team is to achieve a ranking in the top 3 at the end of the 2. Bundesliga season.

Youth summercamp 
In summer 2022 former All Black Kane Hames held a summer camp in Unterföhring with 25 junior players attending. On February 23, 2023 the club announced that they will hold a summer camp for youth players from age 7 to age 17 in Unterföhring. Again, former All Black and current Queensland Reds Assistant Coach Kane Hames will conduct the camp from from July 31 to August 4 in Unterföhring.

Facilities 
The RCU plays their home games on the rugby pitch in Unterföhring am Etzweg.

Honours 

Seniors:
 Bavarian rugby union championship
 Runners-up: 2016, 2017
 Promotion to 2nd Bundesliga
 2017
 Quarter Finals Liga Pokal
 2018

Youth
 Bavarian rugby union championship
 Champions: Under-8: 2017, 2018, 2019; Under-10: 2017, 2018; Under-12: 2019
 Runners-up: Under-8: 2016; Under-10: 2015, 2016; Under-12: 2018; Under-14 2019

Recent seasons
Recent seasons of the club:

Men

First team

Reserve team

Women

References

External links 
  Official website

German rugby union clubs
Rugby union in Munich